Krasatinka is the name of several rural localities in Smolensk Oblast, Russia:
Krasatinka, Krasninsky District, Smolensk Oblast, a village in Oktyabrskoye Rural Settlement of Krasninsky District
Krasatinka, Monastyrshchinsky District, Smolensk Oblast, a village in Tatarskoye Rural Settlement of Monastyrshchinsky District